Aglaia lepiorrhachis is a species of tree in the family Meliaceae. It is endemic to New Guinea.

References

lepiorrhachis
Endemic flora of New Guinea
Trees of New Guinea
Vulnerable plants
Taxonomy articles created by Polbot